Berkheim is a municipality in the district of Biberach in Baden-Württemberg in Germany.

Mayors
In April 2011 Walter Puza was elected mayor with 91.46% of the votes, succeeding Michael Sailer. Puza was re-elected in 2019.

References

Biberach (district)
Württemberg